Tahsin Yücel (17 August 1933 – 22 January 2016) was a Turkish translator, novelist, essayist and literary critic.

Born in Elbistan, Yücel studied at the Istanbul University, graduating in  French philology. After completing his postgraduate studies, in 1978 he became professor in the same university. In addition to being author of essays, novels and short stories, Yücel was mainly active as a translator of about 70 novels from French into Turkish.

References 

1933 births
2016 deaths
People from Elbistan
Turkish translators
Turkish essayists
Turkish male writers
Male essayists
Turkish novelists
Istanbul University alumni
Academic staff of Istanbul University
20th-century translators